This is a list of public aquariums in India. Aquariums are facilities where aquatic animals are confined within tanks and displayed to the public, and in which they may also be bred. Such facilities include public aquariums, oceanariums, marine mammal parks, and dolphinariums

List

See also
List of botanical gardens in India
List of aquaria

Notes

References

 
India
Aquaria
Aquaria
Aquaria